The 1995 Montana Grizzlies football team represented the University of Montana in the 1995 NCAA Division I-AA football season. The Grizzlies were led by tenth-year head coach Don Read and played their home games on campus at Washington–Grizzly Stadium in Missoula.

Montana finished the regular season at 9–2 and 6–1 in conference to win the Big Sky title, and were eighth in the final poll at the end of the regular season.  The Grizzlies won four playoff games, the first three at home, to win the Division I-AA national championship and finish at

Schedule

Roster

References

Montana
Montana Grizzlies football seasons
NCAA Division I Football Champions
Big Sky Conference football champion seasons
Montana Grizzlies football